Lou Rusoff (August 3, 1911 – June 29, 1963) was a Canadian-born screenwriter and producer best known for his work with American International Pictures.

He was brother-in-law to Sam Arkoff and was the screenwriter for many of Roger Corman's first films. He was the father of Ted Rusoff.

Career
Rusoff worked as a social worker and wrote for Canadian radio and television before moving to Hollywood in 1950. He wrote for a number of TV programs then started working for AIP and became their most prolific screenwriter, usually writing scripts to match a concept and poster that AIP had come up with. Arkoff later said:
Often, he was working on five or six scripts simultaneously – not only his own but rewriting other people's screenplays when emergencies occurred and the original writers were unavailable. He also eventually produced some of the AIP movies he wrote... More than any other writer, Lou had a real appreciation for what we were trying to do. He understood how to keep costs down by limiting the number of sets and locations. He framed his scripts beautifully into our titles and artwork. And he always kept a sense of humour, which was a real virtue under hectic circumstances.Writer Mark McGee said "Rusoff's scripts were usually hackneyed and dull but they generally made sense." He worked his way up to vice-president in charge of production.

Rusoff died of brain cancer during the editing of his final film, Beach Party (1963).

He was survived by his wife, two sons, a brother and six sisters.

Select Credits

Terry and the Pirates (1953) (TV series)
Four Star Playhouse (TV series) – writer, director
The Star and the Story (TV series) (1955) – writer
Apache Woman (1955) – writer
The Day the World Ended (1955) – writer
The Phantom from 10,000 Leagues (1955) – writer
The Oklahoma Woman (1955) – writer
It Conquered the World (1956) – writer
Girls in Prison (1956) – writer
The She-Creature (1956) – writer
Runaway Daughters (1956) – writer
Shake, Rattle & Rock! (1956) – writer
Flesh and the Spur (1957) – additional dialogue
Dragstrip Girl (1957) – writer
Cat Girl (1957) – writer, producer
Motorcycle Gang (1958) – writer
Suicide Battalion (1958) – writer, producer
Hot Rod Gang (1958) – writer, producer
Submarine Seahawk (1958) – writer, executive producer
Ghost of Dragstrip Hollow (1959) – writer, producer
Black Sunday (1961) – producer of US version
Alakazam the Great (1961) – producer of US version
Panic in the Year Zero (1962) – producer
Marco Polo (1962) – English version supervisor
Beach Party (1963) – writer, producer
Operation Bikini (1963) – producer

References

Arkoff, Samuel Z & Richard Turbo, Flying Through Hollywood By the Seat of My Pants, Birch Lane Press, 1992

External links

1911 births
1963 deaths
American film producers
American male screenwriters
American television writers
Deaths from brain cancer in the United States
Deaths from cancer in California
American male television writers
20th-century American businesspeople
20th-century American male writers
20th-century American screenwriters
Canadian emigrants to the United States